Hermann Aubin (23 September 1885 – 11 March 1969) was an Austrian-German historian.

Biography
Hermann Aubin was born in Reichenberg, Austria on 23 December 1885. His father was a wealthy factory owner. The Aubin family were descended from French Huguenots who had settled in Frankfurt in the 16th century AD. Aubin graduated at the top of his class from the gymnasium at Reichenberg in July 1904, and subsequently volunteered for a year as a soldier in the Austro-Hungarian Army. Since 1905, Aubin studied history and economics at the universities of Munich and Freiburg. He gained a PhD at Freiburg in 1910 under the supervision of Georg von Below.

After gaining his PhD, Aubin lectured on history in Düsseldorf. During World War I, Aubin served as an officer in the Austro-Hungarian Army on a variety of fronts. He gained his habilitation in 1916 under the supervision of Aloys Schulte. With the dismemberment of Austria-Hungary, Aubin became a German citizen. From 1920 onwards, Aubin taught history in Bonn. Aubin was hit hard economically by the hyperinflation of the 1920s, and the poor economic situation in Germany prevented him from gaining a full professorship. During this time, Aubin contemplated leaving the history profession. In 1925, he was appointed a lecturer at the University of Giessen. In 1929 he was appointed a professor of history at the University of Breslau.

At the end of World War II, Aubin was drafted into the Volksturm and fought in the Siege of Breslau. In 1946, Aubin was appointed Professor of Medieval and Modern History at the University of Hamburg. From 1955, he was honorary professor of history at the University of Freiburg. After the war, Aubin founded and led a number of scholarly organizations. He was the editor of Zeitschrift für Ostmitteleuropa-Forschung from 1952 to 1966. Aubin played a leading role in shaping the field of history in West Germany. On his 70th birthday in December 1955, Aubin received the Grand Cross of the Order of Merit of the Federal Republic of Germany. He died in Freiburg 11 March 1969.

Sources

 Eduard Mühle: Für Volk und deutschen Osten. Der Historiker Hermann Aubin und die deutsche Ostforschung (= Schriften des Bundesarchivs. Bd. 65). Droste, Düsseldorf 2005, .
 Axel Schildt: Aubin, Hermann. In: Franklin Kopitzsch, Dirk Brietzke (Hrsg.): Hamburgische Biografie. Band 6. Wallstein, Göttingen 2012, S. 20–22.
 Hans-Erich Volkmann: Hermann Aubin. In: Michael Fahlbusch, Ingo Haar, Alexander Pinwinkler (Hrsg.): Handbuch der völkischen Wissenschaften. Akteure, Netzwerke, Forschungsprogramme. Unter Mitarbeit von David Hamann. 2. vollständig überarbeitete und erweiterte Auflage. Bd. 1, De Gruyter Oldenbourg, Berlin 2017, S. 55–59.

1885 births
1969 deaths
Austro-Hungarian military personnel of World War I
German nationalists
German people of French descent
Commanders Crosses of the Order of Merit of the Federal Republic of Germany
Ludwig Maximilian University of Munich alumni
Writers from Liberec
Sudeten German people
Academic staff of the University of Breslau
University of Freiburg alumni
Academic staff of the University of Freiburg
Academic staff of the University of Giessen
Academic staff of the University of Hamburg
20th-century German historians
Austro-Hungarian Army officers
Volkssturm personnel
Members of the Göttingen Academy of Sciences and Humanities